SS Victoria may refer to:

 SS Victoria (1870), a coastal passenger liner operated by the Alaska Steamship Company
 , a passenger vessel built for the London and South Western Railway
 , a passenger vessel built for the Pacific Steam Navigation Company
 , a Cross-Channel and Isle of Man ferry
 SS Victoria (Liberty), a Panamanian liberty ship in service 1947–50

Ship names